The Mattie Beal House is a historic house in Lawton, Oklahoma, U.S.. It was built in 1907-09 for Charles Warren Payne and his wife, Mattie Beal. It was acquired by the Lawton Heritage Association in 1973. It was designed in the Colonial Revival architectural style. It has been listed on the National Register of Historic Places since August 19, 1975.

Mattie Beal won the second draw in the 1901 land lottery of former Kiowa-Comanche-Apache reservation lands, which led to worldwide news coverage: "'Miss Mattie Beale, beautiful, blue-eyed, young telephone operator from Wichita, Kansas, draws claim number 2 in Kiowa-Comanche land opening...' That story in the Kansas City Journal was echoed, with pictures, in newspapers everywhere. Among the more than 500 letters proposing marriage were several from English nobility who'd read her story in the London Times.

The house has a porte-cochere and a two-story "barn/garage/servants quarters structure".

References

National Register of Historic Places in Comanche County, Oklahoma
Colonial Revival architecture in Oklahoma
Houses completed in 1909